Lee Dong-wook (born November 6, 1981 ) is a South Korean actor, host, model and entertainer. He is best known for his leading roles in the television dramas My Girl (2005), Scent of a Woman (2011), The Fugitive of Joseon (2013), Hotel King (2014), Guardian: The Lonely and Great God (2016–2017), Life (2018), Touch Your Heart (2019), Hell Is Other People (2019), Tale of the Nine Tailed (2020), and Bad and Crazy (2021) in the titular role. He is also the host of the talk show Strong Heart (2012–2013), boy group survival reality show Produce X 101 (2019), and his own American-style talk show Wook Talk (2019).

Career 
Lee made his acting debut in 1999 in an MBC single-episode drama after winning the grand prize in the V-NESS model contest the same year. The PD of the drama saw Lee, and proceeded to cast him in the teen drama School 2. Lee started to gain recognition with his performance in School 3.

Lee hit stardom with 2005 romantic comedy My Girl. The drama series became a hit during its run both domestically and across Asia, and made Lee a Korean Wave star. The same year he enrolled in Joongbu University, majoring in media and broadcasting arts.

He has since starred in noir Bitter Sweet Life (2008), courtroom dramedy Partner (2009), melodrama Scent of a Woman (2011), baseball rom-com Wild Romance (2012), period thriller The Fugitive of Joseon (2013), and revenge drama Hotel King (2014), in which he reunited with My Girl co-star Lee Da-hae. 
He then starred in fantasy-action series Blade Man (2014) and romance drama Bubble Gum (2015).

Lee and comedian Shin Dong-yup took over as MCs of talk show Strong Heart from April 2012 to January 2013. Lee also joined the reality show Roommate, which aired from 2014 to 2015.

From 2016 to 2017, Lee starred alongside Gong Yoo in Kim Eun-sook's fantasy-romance drama Guardian: The Lonely and Great God playing a grim reaper. The drama was a hit, and along with its success, helped in the resurgence of Lee's acting career.

In 2018, Lee starred in the medical drama Life as a doctor who works at the ER Department.

In 2019, Lee starred in the romance comedy drama Touch Your Heart alongside Guardian co-star Yoo In-na, playing a workaholic lawyer. The same year, he was confirmed as the host for Produce X101, the fourth season of survival audition program Produce 101. He then starred as the main antagonist in the thriller drama Hell Is Other People as a dentist in the morning but a psychopath in the evening. He also started hosting his own talk show, Wook Talk, to celebrate his 20th anniversary since debut.

In 2020, Lee was cast in the fantasy drama Tale of the Nine Tailed as a nine-tailed fox who used to be a mountain god, and is now working as a civil servant. He is also confirmed to appear in the romantic comedy Single in Seoul alongside Im Soo-jung.

In 2021, he appeared in A Year-End Medley, a romantic comedy film by Kwak Jae-yong and in an iQIYI original mystery drama Bad and Crazy, which aired on December 17, 2021.

In 2022, Lee joined the Universe communication platform.

Personal life
Lee enlisted in the military in August 2009, serving under the National Defense Public Relations Service. He was discharged in June 2011.

Ancestry 
His parents are mainly of Korean descent. In a Wook Talk episode that aired on January 22, 2020, guest and forensic professor Yoo Sung-ho revealed genealogical DNA test results for him and one of the show's producers. According to Lee's results, a significant part of his mother's genetic makeup matches that of Koryaks and Khakas people—both ethnic groups that are indigenous to Siberia (to be more specific, Kamchatka and Khakassia respectively).

Philanthropy 
On March 11, 2022, Lee made a donation  million to the Hope Bridge Disaster Relief Association to help the victims of the massive wildfire that started in Uljin, Gyeongbuk and has spread to Samcheok, Gangwon.

Filmography

Bibliography

Ambassadorship

Awards and nominations

State and cultural honors

References

External links 

  

1981 births
Living people
People from Seoul
Male actors from Seoul
20th-century South Korean male actors
21st-century South Korean male actors
King Kong by Starship artists
South Korean male television actors
South Korean male film actors
South Korean male models
South Korean television presenters
South Korean people of indigenous Siberian descent